The Bally Sports app is the video streaming service of the former Fox Sports Networks, now Bally Sports regional sports networks. The app replaces Fox Sports Go (FSGO), the app of the former Fox Sports Networks. The service is available for customers of select cable and satellite TV providers, as well as the DirecTV Stream over-the-top service.

History

The service was initially introduced as Fox Sports' TV Everywhere service, including access to content from networks such as Fox Sports 1 and Big Ten Network (the latter already offered under the brand BTN2Go). Super Bowl XLVIII was streamed for free without authentication on personal computers and tablets, but not on mobile phones due to exclusive rights held by Verizon Wireless. The event averaged 1.7 million viewers on the platform.

For regional telecasts on the Fox Sports Networks, NBA games were available, and Major League Baseball games became available starting with the 2016 season, after Fox Sports and MLB came to an agreement for in-market streaming rights in November 2015. Fox reached a similar deal for regional National Hockey League games beginning in the 2016–17 season.

In 2019, Fox Sports Networks was sold to a partnership of Sinclair Broadcast Group and Entertainment Studios as part of The Walt Disney Company's purchase of Fox's entertainment assets; Fox also sought to divest Fox Sports Networks but were barred from selling them to Disney by federal regulators. The sale included rights to the Fox Sports Go platform; as a result, streaming of national Fox Sports channels (such as Fox Sports 1, Fox Sports 2, and Big Ten Network) and programming was moved exclusively to FoxSports.com and the Fox Sports app, leaving Fox Sports Go to only carry content from the regional networks. The national Fox Sports content continued to be listed on the Fox Sports Go main page as external links during an interim brand-licensing period.

On March 10, 2021, the programming from YES Network (which is also partially owned by Sinclair) was separated from FSGO and moved to a dedicated app.

The Fox Sports Go app was scheduled to be relaunched as part of the Bally Sports rebranding of the Fox Sports Networks on March 31, 2021, but the new app was delayed to a then unspecified date. On April 26, 2021, the Bally Sports app was launched.

On June 23, 2022, Bally Sports soft-launched its Bally Sports Plus (or Bally Sports+) direct-to-consumers (DTC) service, which is accessible through the Bally Sports app. The service is available initially in five MLB cities: Detroit, Kansas City, Miami, Milwaukee, and Tampa. It launched nationally in the remainder of the networks' footprint on September 26.

See also
 WatchESPN
 Hulu
 Philo

References

External links
 Bally Sports website

Fox Sports Networks
Bally Sports 
Universal Windows Platform apps